Amanda Fortier (born 9 March 1978) is a Canadian cross-country skier. She competed in four events at the 2002 Winter Olympics.

Cross-country skiing results
All results are sourced from the International Ski Federation (FIS).

Olympic Games

World Championships

a.  Cancelled due to extremely cold weather.

World Cup

Season standings

Team podiums

 1 podium – (1 )

References

External links
 

1978 births
Living people
Canadian female cross-country skiers
Olympic cross-country skiers of Canada
Cross-country skiers at the 2002 Winter Olympics
Sportspeople from Edmonton